Arowanas are freshwater bony fish of the subfamily Osteoglossinae, also known as bony tongues (the latter name is now often reserved for Arapaiminae). In this family of fish, the head is bony and the elongated body is covered by large, heavy scales, with a mosaic pattern of canals. The dorsal and anal fins have soft rays and are long based, while the pectoral and ventral fins are small. The name "bonytongues" is derived from a toothed bone on the floor of the mouth, the "tongue", equipped with teeth that bite against teeth on the roof of the mouth. The arowana is a facultative air breather and can obtain oxygen from air by sucking it into its swim bladder, which is lined with capillaries like lung tissue.

Evolution
Within Osteoglossinae, the South America Osteoglossum arowanas diverged from the Asian and Australian Scleropages arowanas about 170 Mya, during the Middle Jurassic.

The Osteoglossidae are the only exclusively freshwater fish family found on both sides of the Wallace Line. This may be explained by the theory that Asian arowanas  (S. formosus) diverged from the Australian Scleropages, S. jardinii and S. leichardti, about 140 Mya, making it likely that Asian arowanas were carried to Asia on the Indian subcontinent.

Fossil record
At least five extinct genera, known only from fossils, are classified as osteoglossids; these date back at least as far as the Late Cretaceous. Other fossils from as far back as the Late Jurassic or Early Cretaceous are widely considered to belong to the arowana superorder Osteoglossomorpha. Osteoglossomorph fossils have been found on all continents except Antarctica. These fossil genera include Brychaetus, Joffrichthys, and Phareodus.

Taxonomy
 Genus †Anaedopogon Cope 1871
 Genus †Foreyichthys Taverne 1979
 Genus †Nieerkunia Su 1992
 Genus †Osteoglossidarum [otolith]
 Genus †Ridewoodichthys Taverne 2009
 Genus †Taverneichthys Kumar, Rana & Paliwal 2005
 Genus †Tetoriichthys Yabumoto 2008
 Genus †Phareodus Leidy, 1873
 Subfamily Osteoglossinae Bonaparte 1832
 Genus Scleropages Günther 1864
 Genus Osteoglossum Agassiz ex Spix & Agassiz 1829 non Basilewsky 1855

Behavior
Osteoglossids are carnivorous, often being specialized surface feeders. They are excellent jumpers;  Osteoglossum species have been seen leaping more than 6 ft (almost 2 m) from the water surface to pick off insects and birds from overhanging branches in South America, hence the nickname "water monkeys". Arowana species typically grow to around 2 to 3 ft in captivity.

Arowanas can be troublesome to keep as pets. They are expensive, require wide living space, are picky eaters and need a lot of care. Arowanas are renowned for their aggressive behavior and personality.

Several species of osteoglossids exhibit parental care. They build nests and protect their young after they hatch. All species are mouthbrooders, the parents holding sometimes hundreds of eggs in their mouths. The young may make several tentative trips outside the parent's mouth to investigate the surroundings before leaving permanently.

Unlike most fishes that start reproducing at around six months of age, the Arowana usually takes three to four years to reach sexual maturity.

In the aquarium
Depending on the classification system used, there are 10 types of arowana commonly kept as pets; 4 from Asia, 3 from South America, 2 from Australia and 1 from Africa.

Asian arowana is an endangered species and banned in the United States. It is a status symbol among wealthy Asian men. An albino arowana sold for a record price of $300,000 in 2009. Most pet arowana are farmed behind high-security fences.

Arowanas are solitary fish and only allow company while young; adults may show dominance and aggression. Some compatible species often partnered with this fish are clown knifefish, pacu, oscars, jaguar cichlids, green terrors, gar, tinfoil barb, Siamese tigerfish, and any other somewhat aggressive fish that cannot fit in the arowana's mouth. These fish are best kept with live or frozen feed and they easily outgrow the tank within 8 to 10 months. An aquarium with the minimum diameter of 6' by 3.5' and 300 gallons is suggested as a bare minimum but 400-800 gallons is the best way to go.  Australian species are best kept alone in aquaria.

It is estimated that the total annual revenue of the Asian arowana sector was over US$200 million globally since 2012.

Etymology
The name comes from the Tupí language arua'ná, aruanã or arauaná.

References

External links

Asian Arowana: The Dragon Fish and a True Legend - About Fish Tank. Retrieved April 18, 2020.

Osteoglossidae
Extant Late Cretaceous first appearances
Taxa named by Charles Lucien Bonaparte
monkey